The American Legion Memorial Highway can refer to the following highways in the United States:

Interstate 75 in Michigan, entire state segment
Interstate 81 in Pennsylvania, entire state segment
New Jersey Route 10

Monuments and memorials in Michigan
Monuments and memorials in Pennsylvania